The 2003 Segunda División Peruana, the second division of Peruvian football (soccer), was played by 13 teams. The tournament winner, Sport Coopsol, was promoted to the First Division. The last place, América Cochahuayco, was relegated. The tournament was played on a home-and-away round-robin basis.

Results

Standings

Notes

External links
 RSSSF

Peruvian Segunda División seasons
Peru2
2003 in Peruvian football